Tonopah Test Range Airport , at the Tonopah Test Range (Senior Trend project site PS-66) is  southeast of Tonopah, Nevada, and  northwest of Las Vegas, Nevada. It is a major airfield with a  runway, instrument approach facilities, and nighttime illumination.  The facility has over fifty hangars and an extensive support infrastructure.

Overview
Tonopah is controlled by the USAF Air Combat Command. The known primary use of this airport is to shuttle government employees to the weapons test range from Harry Reid International Airport in Las Vegas.

The primary (paved) access to the facility is off of U.S. Route 6 at the north end of the airport. Dirt road access points also exist on the south and east sides of the range.

History
The Tonopah Range Airport first opened in 1957, supporting operations on the test range itself, which was used for United States Atomic Energy Commission (AEC, later Department of Energy or DOE) funded nuclear weapon programs.  It was apparently not a World War II era field, as it is not listed in the 1944 US Army/Navy Directory of Airfields. Eventually, the installation and its 6,000 ft asphalt runway was abandoned. The area was open range, with wild horses running free.

The earliest known depiction of the airfield was on the July 1970 Air Force Tactical Pilotage Chart.  The 1982 Aircraft Owners and Pilots Association Airport Directory described the Tonopah Test Range airfield as having a single  paved runway.

Foreign technology evaluation
The advent of Operation Rolling Thunder during the Vietnam War in March 1965 led to the introduction of the obsolete and subsonic MiG-17 (J5) and the supersonic MiG-21 by the North Vietnamese Air Force (NVAF) being pitted against U.S. aircraft.

On 16 August 1966, Iraqi Air Force Captain Munir Redfa took off from Rasheed Air Base, near Baghdad on a routine navigation training flight.  He headed southwest in an attempt to defect from Iraq to Israel.  Crossing the Jordanian border, Jordanian interceptors were unable to catch him, and upon crossing the Israeli border, two Israeli Defense Forces (IDF) Mirage III interceptors approached his aircraft.  Captain Radfa lowered his landing gear, making a signal that he posed no threat, and he was attempting to defect.   He landed his Soviet-built MiG-21F-13 (Fishbed "E") fighter at Hatzor Airbase, Israel and was granted asylum.

The MiG-21 posed a major threat to Israeli Air Defenses as well as to American pilots over the skies of North Vietnam.  Over the next year, the IDF put in over 100 hours of testing of the MiG-21 and shared the results with the United States.   In a secret agreement negotiated with the United States Defense Intelligence Agency (DIA), Israel agreed to loan the MiG to the United States in exchange for Israel purchasing the F-4 Phantom II, at the time the top-of-the-line fighter for both the USAF and United States Navy. In late 1967, a USAF Douglas C-124 landed in Israel, and the MiG was loaded into the cargo hold, and flown to Groom Lake.  At Groom Lake, it was then re-assembled for flight, and evaluated in a series of test flights known as HAVE DOUGHNUT.   The aircraft made its first flight at Groom Lake in January 1968.  AFSC  recruited its evaluation pilots from the Air Force Flight Test Center, while Tactical Air Command's were primarily United States Air Force Weapons School graduates.  By mid-1968, the MiG-21 was far less of an enigma than it had been. Over 102 sorties were flown in the aircraft.

On 12 August 1968, the IDF obtained two Syrian Air Force MiG-17F ("Fresco C") fighters that had gotten lost during a training flight and landed inadvertently at Betzet Landing Field, Israel.  The MiG-17 was of paramount importance to the United States, because it was also used by the North Vietnamese Air Force.  It was much more agile than the supersonic MiG-21, and in experienced hands it would run rings around the F-4 Phantom.   After a brief period of testing, the first MiG-17, coded HAVE DRILL arrived at Groom Lake in January 1969.  The second MiG-17, HAVE FERRY, arrived in March.   By June 1969, the results of the evaluations of the MiG-21 and MiG-17s were incorporated into the USAF Fighter Weapons School and the Navy TOPGUN training school.

In 1969 Pakistan supplied the U.S. with a Chinese-built MiG-19 (J6) which was tested under the Have Drill program. These aircraft were given USAF designations and fake serial numbers so that they may be identified in DOD standard flight logs. In May 1973, Project HAVE IDEA was formed which took over from the older HAVE DOUGHNUT, HAVE FERRY and HAVE DRILL projects.

In May 1973, when Project Have Idea was initiated for joint technical and tactical evaluation of Soviet aircraft types, the tactical evaluation flights of foreign aircraft were undertaken by Detachment 1, 57th Fighter Weapons Wing.

4477th Test and Evaluation Squadron

In July 1975, the 4477th Tactical Evaluation Flight ("Red Eagles") was formed at Nellis AFB as tactical evaluation organization.  Also in the early 1970s, the concept of "Aggressor Squadrons", was born, using the Northrop F-5E Tiger II, which was found to be nearly identical in terms of maneuvering and speed with the MiG-21 to train front-line combat pilots in Soviet Air Force tactics.  Aggressor training was done where the units went head to head against USAF fighters in mock dogfights at this time to find out and exploit possible weaknesses.

Foreign military sales of United States fighter aircraft to Indonesia and Egypt in the mid-1970s to replace the Soviet fighter aircraft allowed these nations to clandestinely transfer un-needed MiG-21 and ultra modern MiG-23s aircraft to the United States for evaluation.  Up to 25 of these Soviet aircraft made their way to Groom Lake and pilots assigned to Detachment 1, 57th FWW at Nellis were sent to the facility for training as "Aggressor" pilots.  These pilots then were reassigned to the aggressor training units at Clark AB, Philippines,  RAF Alconbury, England and Nellis AFB.    However, by the mid-1970s, as the fleet of Soviet aircraft grew at Groom Lake,  the facilities there were becoming crowded and the MiGs needed another clandestine home.

Several locations were considered, Michael Army Airfield at the Dugway Proving Grounds in Utah, and the Gila Bend Air Force Auxiliary Field on the Goldwater Range in Arizona. The Tonopah Test Range Airport, however, was only 70 miles to the northwest of Groom Lake and was on the controlled AEC Test Range, so it better fit the need for a new home. The AEC airport had the potential for improvement and expansion, with the only public land overlooking the base miles away. Although not as hidden as Groom Lake, the airport was remote enough to operate the Soviet aircraft in secrecy. In fact, the security surrounding the Tonopah Test Range was so effective that the new base was not publicly reported as an Air Force military airfield until 1985.  On 1 April 1977, the 4477th TEF was reassigned to Tonopah.  In December 1977 the 6513th Test Squadron (“Red Hats”) was formed at Edwards AFB to perform technical evaluations of these aircraft.

In 1980 the 4477th TEF was re-designated as the 4477th Test and Evaluation Squadron and the operation was renamed again to Constant Peg. The squadron developed realistic combat training operations featuring adversary tactics, dissimilar air combat training, and electronic warfare. Planes kept coming in from other sources as well. No less than three Cuban pilots brought their MiGs to Florida. A number of Chinese made MiGs were purchased outright from China via the front company Combat Core Certification Professionals Company (CCCP!) and imported in crates. Three Syrians flew their MiG-23 and MiG-29s to Turkey in 1988.

Over the course of its history U.S. test pilots flew several models of Soviet-designed MiGs.
 Mikoyan-Gurevich MiG-17 were a subsonic, early jet aircraft design. Though originally meant to counter American bombers of the 1950s and 1960s, durable, cigar-shaped MiG-17s became North Vietnam's primary fighter and eventually served in at least 20 air forces worldwide.  MiG-17s were designated as:
  YF-113A Soviet MiG-17F NATO:"Fresco-C" used in HAVE DRILL program
  YF-113C Chinese J-5 used in HAVE PRIVILEGE program
  YF-114C Soviet MiG-17F NATO:"Fresco-C" used in HAVE FERRY program

  YF-114D Soviet MiG-17PF NATO:"Fresco-D" (Serial: 75-008)
 Shenyang J-6 (J-6/Jianjiji-6 (Fighter Aircraft, Type 6)/F-6 (Export model) Farmer, is a 30mm gun Chinese license built version of the Mikoyan-Gurevich MiG-19, Russia's first supersonic interceptor.  While the USSR produced less than 2,000 MiG-19s, later discarding it in favor of the MiG-21 due to excessive accidents, the Chinese endorsed the aircraft, fixed the reliability problems and built over 3,000 of them; more than any other nation.  J-6s were exported to North Vietnam at the end of Operation Rolling Thunder which ended in 1968, but saw extensive aerial combat during operations Linebacker and Linebacker II in 1972.  The J-6 made its first flight in 1959 and went into production in 1963.  Six primary models were produced:
  Shenyang J-6 (F-6) Farmer-C Tactical Fighter
           J-6A (F-6A) Farmer-B Interceptor
           J-6A  Farmer-B W/Missiles
  Nanchang J-6B  Farmer-D Interceptor W/Missiles
  Shenyang J-6C  Farmer-C Tactical Fighter
  Shenyang J2-6 (FR-6) Farmer-C Tactical Reconnaissance Fighter
Pakistan was the first and largest customer of the J-6 (F-6) receiving nearly 300 aircraft, mostly of the J-6C (F-6C) variety.
There were few external differences between the earlier MiG-19 and J-6 models. Later J-6 models had their pitot tubes positioned on the right side of the fuselage forward of the cockpit and a bullet-shaped fairing which contained the brake parachute positioned under the aircraft's fin.
 Mikoyan-Gurevich MiG-21 were cone-nosed, supersonic fighters that were somewhat less maneuverable than MiG-17s. They also saw action with the North Vietnamese and became a popular export aircraft, with more than 8,000 produced. MiG-21s were designated as:
 YF-110B Soviet MiG-21F-13 NATO:"Fishbed-C/E" (Serials assigned: 75-001, 75-004 and 75-010)
 YF-110C Chinese Chengdu J-7B (MiG-21F-13 variant)
 YF-110D Soviet MiG-21MF NATO:"Fishbed-J"

 Mikoyan-Gurevich MiG-23 were the MiG-21's replacement. Their swing-wing was patterned on that of the F-111, but unlike their US antecedent, the MiG-23s were small and light enough to serve as dogfighters.  MiG-23s were designated as:
 YF-113B Soviet MiG-23BN NATO:"Flogger-F"
 YF-113E Soviet MiG-23MS NATO:"Flogger-E"

In addition, unconfirmed Soviet aircraft flown were MiG-25 Foxbat (YF-116); MiG-29 Fulcrum (YF-118) and Sukhoi Su-22 Fitter (YF-112). Crashes associated with the foreign aircraft included the 1979 Tonopah MiG-17 crash during training versus an F-5 and the 1984 Little Skull Mountain MiG-23 crash which killed a USAF general, Robert M. Bond.

Aerial dogfights were staged between the various MiG models against virtually every fighter in US service, and against SAC's B-52 Stratofortress and B-58 Hustlers to judge the ability of the bombers countermeasures systems, they performed radar cross-section and propulsion tests that contributed greatly to improvements in US aerial performance.

All the models had quirks. The MiG-17 did not have an electric seat, so pilots had to use cushions to position themselves properly inside the cockpit. Both it and the MiG-21 had pneumatic brakes applied by squeezing a lever on the front of the stick. Many of the MiG-21s did not have steerable nose gears, making them difficult to taxi; the sign of a novice Fishbed pilot was the zigzag track he made while moving on the ground.  If a pilot put the throttle back on a MiG-21, it would take a long time to spool up again when trying to accelerate. Thus many of those who flew it stayed on afterburners as much as possible. The MiG-23 did not have that problem, as it was designed for speed—but it was unstable and difficult to fly.

None of the Soviet-designed aircraft at Tonopah flew in bad weather or at night. All were very short-legged, compared to contemporary US aircraft, and sorties were limited to 20 minutes or so. The MiGs had US airspeed indicators and a few other minor instrument and safety modifications. Other than that, they were stock—down to their Warsaw Pact paint jobs.  Two pilots of the 4477th died flying the Soviet planes. The pilots had no manuals for the aircraft, although some tried to write one. Nor was there a consistent supply of spare parts, which had to be refurbished or manufactured at high cost.

What was learned during these projects prompted the US Navy to commence Top Gun exercises first at NAS Miramar, California and then NAS Fallon, Nevada. Shortly thereafter the Air Force commenced its Red Flag exercises at Nellis AFB, Nevada.

Near the end of the Cold War the program was abandoned and the squadron was disbanded. Flight operations closed down in March 1988, although the 4477th was not inactivated until July 1990, according to one official Air Force history.   The decision to shut down operations may have had something to do with the fact that a new generation of Soviet aircraft was entering service and also the inevitable round of budget cuts from Washington.

The assets of the squadron could not go to the boneyard at Davis-Monthan AFB, and the fate of them remains, in some cases, still classified.   Several of the F-110s (MiG-21) were sent to museums or now are on static display.   Some of the airplanes may have been broken up, and it is rumored that some were buried in the Nevada desert.   In addition, a few were used for target practice on Air Force weapons ranges.

In 2006, the Constant Peg program was declassified and the USAF held a series of press conferences about the former top secret US MiGs. It was revealed that the US MiGs flew more than 15,000 sorties and nearly 7,000 aircrew flew in training against dissimilar aggressors in the Nevada desert between 1980 and the end of the program in 1988.

Detachment 3, 53d Test and Evaluation Group

After the 4477th TES was inactivated, the remaining assets were reconstituted as a detachment of the 57th Fighter Wing at Nellis AFB.  It later became DET 2, 57th Fighter Wing in October 1991 and DET 2, 57th Wing in April 1993; in October 1996, DET 2, 57th Wing, became Detachment 3 of the 53rd Test and Evaluation Group.  It is believed that Air Force Materiel Command operates MiG-29 Fulcrums and Su-27 Flanker aircraft somewhere in Nevada flying against Fighter Weapons School instructors, 422d Test and Evaluation Squadron aircrews and F-15 Eagle and F-16 Fighting Falcon "Aggressor" aircraft flying from Nellis AFB.

It is known that the USAF continues a Foreign Materiel Acquisition/Exploitation program, although the extent of acquisitions and operations of that program is not available.  In March 1991, in the aftermath of the 1991 Gulf War, a team from the Joint Captured Materiel Exploitation Center arrived at Jalibah Southeast Air Base in Iraq. They returned with a MiG-29 nose, providing Air Force intelligence personnel with a Slot Back I radar and the Fulcrum's infrared search and tracking system.  Later in the decade, Air Force intelligence personnel were able to acquire more complete versions of the MiG-29, the result of spending money rather than fighting a war. In October 1997, the US purchased 21 fighter aircraft from the Republic of Moldova—including the MiG-29UB. According to the National Air and Space Intelligence Center, after "undergoing years of study" and employing "all the [center’s foreign materiel exploitation] resources," the MiG-29UB was displayed in front of NASIC headquarters at Wright-Patterson AFB, Ohio.

In 1997, the United States purchased 21 Moldovan aircraft for evaluation and analysis, under the Cooperative Threat Reduction accord. Fourteen were MiG-29Ss, which are equipped with an active radar jammer in its spine and are capable of being armed with nuclear weapons. Part of the United States’ motive to purchase these aircraft was to prevent them from being sold to "rogue states", especially Iran.  In late 1997, the MiGs were delivered to the National Air and Space Intelligence Center (NASIC) at Wright-Patterson Air Force Base near Dayton, Ohio, though many of the former Moldovan MiG-29s are believed to have been scrapped.

In 2003, after the seizure of the Iraqi Air Force Al-Taqaddum Air Base, an advanced Russian MiG-25 Foxbat was found buried in the sand after an informant tipped off U.S. troops. The MiG was dug out of a massive sand dune near the Al Taqqadum airfield by U.S. Air Force recovery teams. The MiG was reportedly one of over two dozen Iraqi jets buried in the sand.

Contrary to what some in the major media have reported, not all the jets found at captured Iraqi Air Force bases were from the Gulf War era. The Russian-made MiG-25 Foxbat recovered was an advanced reconnaissance version never before seen in the West and was equipped with sophisticated electronic warfare devices. Air Force recovery teams had to use large earth-moving equipment to uncover the MiG, which was over 70 feet long and weighed 25 tons. The advanced electronic reconnaissance version found by the U.S. Air Force is currently in service with the Russian air force.

F-117A Nighthawk program

In the 1980s, Tonopah Airport became a major operating location for the  Lockheed F-117A Nighthawk. The first flight testing of the stealth YF-117A aircraft began in June 1981 at Groom Lake Nevada. However, Groom Lake had too many other operations going on to support an operational unit. The F-117 test unit remained at Groom until shortly after the 1991 Gulf War. In addition, there were security concerns because an operational unit based at Groom Lake would involve many more people who could now see things that they should not be seeing. Therefore, a new covert base had to be established for F-117 operations.

In the summer of 1979, Tonopah Test Range Airport was selected to be the home of the Tactical Air Command 4450th Tactical Group (4450th TG). The mission of the 4450th at Tonopah was to guide the classified F-117A Stealth Fighter to an initial operating capability.

Beginning in October 1979 Tonopah Test Range Airport was reconstructed and expanded. The base was immediately staffed with US Air Force security police. The flight line was walled off with a double fence; the only access to the runway was through gates. The area between the fences was lighted at night and had intruder detectors. At first, the facilities were limited to a few buildings, a small mess hall, and sixteen winterized trailers. Security checkpoints were placed on the sole public access road which led to the TTR. Taxiways, a concrete apron, a large maintenance hangar, and a propane storage tank were added. Phase II of the expansion consisted of the construction of an extra taxiway, a new control tower, a  hangar, a parts warehouse, a dining hall, a water storage tank, and extensive fuel storage tanks. Extensions were made to taxiways, to the ramp, the runway gained arrester gear, and new navigation aids were installed. More fuel storage was provided, together with Liquid Oxygen (LOX) storage, a fire station, and the first 24 aircraft hangars. The cost was over $100 million.

On 17 May 1982, the move of the 4450th TG from Groom Lake to Tonopah was initiated, with the final components of the move completed in early 1983. The Tactical Air Command ("R"-Unit), also known as the 
"Baja Scorpions" unit, remained at Groom Lake until the last production F-117 was delivered from Lockheed in July 1990. During the operational lifetime of the F-117 however, personnel from Tonopah and later Holloman AFB would be temporarily deployed to Groom Lake for various checkout flights of classified elements of the aircraft.

The F-117 project was highly classified and Tonopah Test Range became a black project facility. Nearly all Air Force personnel and their families lived in the city of Las Vegas. Group personnel would be flown to Tonopah each Monday morning and board a contract Key Airlines Boeing 727-100 aircraft at Nellis AFB, which operated about 15 daily flights between the two bases. The member would live in dormitories at "Mancamp" during the work week, then fly back to Nellis AFB Thursday afternoon or Friday morning. All dormitory rooms had private bathrooms and showers, televisions with about 30 cable TV channels, a telephone with unrestricted local service to Las Vegas, access to laundry rooms in the building, and access to 24-hour recreational and dining facilities around Mancamp. Civilian engineers and executives were allowed to commute on the Key Airlines or Janet flights, but all other civilians generally lived in the surrounding region and drove to the TTR in their own vehicles or commuted in chartered buses.

On Friday afternoons, the reverse would take place, leaving only essential personnel at Tonopah over the weekend. At Nellis, the passenger jets sitting in the shadow of the foothills bordering the flight line became a common sight. If the base personnel knew—and many of them did—that the contractor aircraft were there to ferry most of the 2,500 inhabitants of Tonopah to work, they did not talk about it much. It was part of what became known as the “Night Hawk spirit,” the devotion to a secret worth keeping. It pervaded Tonopah and its sister base at Nellis, where thousands of family members knew not to ask where their loved ones went for four days each week.

Support aircraft

Because of the tight restrictions on F-117A flights during the 4450th TG "black" era, a surrogate aircraft was needed for training and practice and to provide a cover story for the 4450th TG's existence. The aircraft chosen was the Ling-Temco-Vought (LTV) A-7 Corsair II. The A-7Ds came from England AFB, Louisiana, which was converting to the A-10 Thunderbolt II. The A-7 had been chosen as an interim trainer because its cockpit layout and avionics were considered similar to those in the F-117. It was also a single-seat attack fighter, as the F-117 was programmed to be. It therefore would bring all pilots to a common flight training base line. The 4450th TG was the last active USAF unit to fly the A-7D. Along with the A-7Ds that came from England AFB, the group acquired one of the new A-7K twin-seat trainers from the Arizona Air National Guard for checkout flights at Nellis. A second A-7K was acquired from Edwards AFB (73-1008), which was the prototype two-seater that had been converted from its original A-7D configuration in 1978. In doing so, the group became the only active-duty unit to fly the A-7K.

A-7D flight operations began in June 1981 concurrent with the very first YF-117A flights. The A-7's wore a unique "LV" tailcode (for Las Vegas) and were based officially at Nellis Air Force Base. They were maintained by the 4450th Maintenance Squadron, based at Nellis. Some A-7s operated from Tonopah from the beginning, and care was taken to leave them outside the hangars, so that satellites passing overhead could see that Tonopah operated nothing more exciting than some Corsairs. There were approximately 20 aircraft, including a couple of A-7K trainers.

In addition to providing an excuse for the 4450th's existence and activities the A-7's were also used to maintain pilot currency, particularly in the early stages when very few production F-117As were available. The pilots learned to fly chase on F-117A test and training flights, perform practice covert deployments, and practice any other purpose that could not be accomplished using F-117As, given the tight restrictions imposed on all F-117A operations. On off-range flights, the pilots talked to the air traffic controllers as if they were in an A-7D Corsair II. Each F-117 aircraft also carried a transponder that indicated to radar operators that it was an A-7.

In January 1989, just three months after the USAF admitted the F-117A existed, the aging A-7's were replaced with newer T-38A and AT-38B Talon trainers as a measure to streamline the F-117A's training operation. Many of these "Talons" formerly belonged to the 4447th TS "Red Hats" that flew "acquired" Soviet aircraft at Groom Lake, Nevada. One of the AT-38B Talons even served as a USAF Thunderbird in the 1970s. With the arrival of the T-38s, the squadrons Corsairs were retired; the borrowed A-7K being returned to the Arizona Air National Guard.

F-117A operations

Routine F-117A operations began in late 1982. Before each night's sorties, there would be a mass briefing of the pilots, followed by target and route study. The hangar doors were not opened until one hour after sunset. This meant the first takeoff would not be made until about 7:00 P.M. in winter and 9:30 P.M. in the summer. Eventually two waves were flown per night. This involved eight primary aircraft and two spares, for a total of eighteen sorties. The aircraft would fly the first wave (called the "early-go"), then return to TTR and be serviced. A second group of pilots would then fly the second wave (the "late-go"). Typically, the training flights simulated actual missions. A normal mission would have two targets and several turn points. On other nights, there would be a "turkey shoot" with some fourteen targets. The pilots would get points for each one; at the end of the night, they would be added up to see who "won." The missions ranged across the southwest, and the targets were changed each time, to make it more challenging.

The second wave was completed by about 2:30 or 3:00 A.M. in the winter, a few hours later in the summer. The planes had to be in their hangars and the doors closed one hour before sunrise. After landing, the pilots would be debriefed.

The area around TTR was closely monitored. If a truck was seen in the hills around the base, it would be checked out, as were airplanes flying near the base's restricted airspace. Air Force members were also prohibited from driving into the town of Tonopah without special permission. Internal security at the base was also stringent. Personnel crossing into the double-fence area housing the hangars and flightline were required to pass through a security control point. This relied upon the Identimat hand geometry scanner, a biometric technology acquired by Wackenhut, the same company that provided perimeter security on the TTR. The F-117 operations building was a giant vault with no windows. Within the building was another vault room where the flight manuals were stored. When in use, the manuals always had to be in the pilot's physical possession. If a pilot had to go to the bathroom, his manuals were loaned to another pilot or returned to the vault.

The new F-117 fleet was considered for several high-profile military operations during the mid-1980s, but operations remained largely confined to nighttime flights around Nevada and California for a number of years. It took a presidential authorization to begin off-range flights. In the event of an unscheduled landing, the pilots carried a signed letter from a senior Air Force general ordering the base or wing commander to protect the aircraft.

37th Tactical Fighter Wing 

In spite of the tight security, the Air Force was already making plans to “normalize” future support within the AF Logistics Command structure. As a "black" program, it would probably never achieve a support structure similar to that for F-15s or F-111s. Sacramento Air Logistics Center was tasked in late 1983/early 1984 to prepare to take on full logistics and management responsibility for support of the F-117A. A depot was established in 1984 to accomplish repairs and install modifications on the aircraft. This depot, first located in Lockheed's Palmdale Plant 10 (PS-77), eventually took the place of Lockheed Depot Field Teams performing the depot work at Tonopah. The F-117s were moved between the TTR and depot by C-5, and were only loaded and unloaded at night. This arrangement required the aircraft to be defueled, disassembled, cradled, and then loaded aboard the C-5, flown to the depot, and unloaded before the real work could begin. Of course, this meant that the reverse actions had to occur at the end of the depot work before the aircraft could be reassembled, flight-tested, and redelivered to Tonopah.

In addition to the logistical problems, the security also created safety problems. The nighttime operations resulted in two F-117A losses due to spatial disorientation, one of the planes crashing 30 miles east of the airfield in October 1987. An F-117 based at Tonopah Test Range and piloted by Maj. Ross Mulhare crashed on July 11, 1986 near Bakersfield, California. Another F-117 piloted by Michael C. Stewart was lost on October 14, 1987 on the range about 30 miles east of the TTR Airfield, and it took the Air Force nearly a day to find the wreckage In both crashes the pilot was killed on impact, and both were attributed to fatigue and disorientation.

In November 1988 the Air Force formally acknowledged its F-117 activities at Tonopah, bringing what was a "black world" program into "gray world" status. However, F-117 flight operations continued to be restricted to the nighttime hours. Late in 1989 the Air Force began preparations to lead the F-117 into regular Air Force operations. This would be done in two phases: first, bringing the aircraft under the umbrella of the Tactical Air Command, and second, locating the fleet at a regular Air Force base. The first phase came on October 5, 1989 when the 4450th Tactical Group was inactivated and the 37th Tactical Fighter Wing from George AFB was assigned to Tonopah. The Tactical Air Command (TAC) also activated the Det 1, 57 Fighter Weapons Wing (FWW) at Tonopah. During this phase, three pairs of F-117 aircraft left the TTR for Panama in December 1989 to participate in Operation JUST CAUSE. Only one mission with two F-117As was attempted.

In April 1990, the F-117 was placed on public display at Nellis AFB and the Air Force mission at Tonopah Test Range became a mostly unclassified "white world" program, though at no time would the general public be permitted near the TTR complex or on the Nellis Range. During this phase, daytime F-117 flying operations began. Previously, training sorties were flown at nighttime under radio silence and without air traffic control contact. The change to daytime, white-world flying required much less vigilance on the part of pilots and was cited as improving the safety of training operations.

Summer 1990 saw the peak of Air Force activity at the Tonopah Test Range Airport. After the Iraqi invasion of Kuwait the base was mobilized to support Desert Shield. On August 19, 1990, 22 F-117A's from the 415th and a dozen tankers left Tonopah for Langley AFB. A total of 18 F-117s would continue onward to Khamis Mushait Air Base in Saudi Arabia for Operation DESERT SHIELD, followed by hundreds of TTR support personnel. The planes and a contingent of Tonopah Test Range personnel remained in Saudi Arabia until late 1991. As a result of the deployment and the pending relocation to New Mexico, flying operations and staffing at the TTR declined significantly during 1991. Some of the support facilities which had been open 24 hours a day, such as the dining halls and library, began routinely closing at night.

Move to Holloman Air Force base 
The second phase of real-world integration came in January 1990 with the announcement that the 37th TFW would move from Tonopah to Holloman AFB, New Mexico, which would ultimately be delayed due to the Gulf War.

As a result of the end of the Cold War, reduced defense budgets were the order of the day. In reviewing its tactical bases and the costs of maintaining them, it was determined that the 37th FW operations from Tonopah required considerable logistics support via commercial air and trucking. All military personnel were permanently assigned to Nellis AFB, Nevada, and were transported once each week by air. Also the security requirements of the F-117A had been lessened with its introduction into the Air Force inventory as an operational weapons system. It was determined that a considerable amount of money would be saved by moving the F-117 operations out of the remote site at Tonopah. Tactical Air Command also believed, while Tonopah Airport was adequate for testing and development of aircraft, it was unsuitable as a fully operational tactical base.  Also, the Air Force wanted to retire the F-15A/B Eagles operated by the 49th Fighter Wing at Holloman AFB, New Mexico, most of which were manufactured in the mid-1970s and were costing more and more to operate.  As a result, plans were put in place to construct suitable facilities for the F-117A at Holloman AFB and to retire the F-15A/B models of the 49th FW.

The official ceremony for the F-117A arrival at Holloman AFB came on May 9, 1992, setting into motion the final exodus of the Air Force at Tonopah. On June 1, 1992 Det 1, 57 FWW moved from Tonopah to Nellis AFB. On July 8, the 37th FW was inactivated and the 415th FS, 416th FS, and 417th FS had all become part of the 49th Fighter Wing. By August 1992, the TTR Airport was largely in caretaker status with many of the facilities mothballed.

Post 1992 
After 1992, very little was published about what, if any, aircraft were based there.  The facility was placed on caretaker status effective 31 December 1992, however the USAF continued to maintain the runway as active along with the navigation aids remaining open to the DOE and the USAF on an as-needed basis.

In July 2001, a commercial McDonnell Douglas MD-82 aircraft landed at the Tonopah Test Range airfield due to a cargo fire warning light, according to an ASRS report.  It departed without incident.

Role and operations

RQ-170 Sentinel 

The 30th Reconnaissance Squadron, operating Predator Unmanned Aerial Vehicles, was activated at Tonopah in August 2005 as part of the 57th Operations Group at Nellis. The squadron currently operates the USAF's RQ-170 Sentinel UAVs. It may also be used by the Detachment 3, 53d Test and Evaluation Group for foreign aircraft evaluation testing.

F-117A storage
In 2008, the surviving fleet of 52 production F-117As were stored, with wings removed, in their original hangars at Tonopah. Since the aircraft still contain classified material, the Air Force was not able to mothball them in the normal facilities and will use hangars at Tonopah instead. One of the mothballed Stealth Fighters is painted in “Gray Dragon” experimental camouflage.  The last operational F-117A left Air Force Plant 42 at Palmdale, California,  home of the Lockheed Skunk Works for Tonopah on 11 August 2008, marking the disbandment of the 410th Flight Test Squadron, the last operational F-117A squadron. Of these, one was scrapped to test effective methods of disposing of the fleet.

However, it appears that in 2010, four F-117A aircraft plus two maintenance spares are reportedly back in use for R&D purposes at Groom Lake, but the rest remain in storage at Tonopah.   F-117s were seen flying in the Nevada skies in May 2013.  F-117s have been spotted flying near Tonopah as recently as February 2019. In October of 2020, a F-117A was spotted landing at MCAS Miramar in San Diego.

Department of Energy 
The airfield continues to be used by the DOE in support of its mission at the Tonopah Test Range. The DOE facility supports approximately 15 flights per week for its operations. The remaining flights are in support of the USAF and other organizations at the Tonopah Test Range.

Based units 
Flying and notable non-flying units based at Tonopah Test Range Airport.

Units marked GSU are Geographically Separate Units, which although based at Tonopah, are subordinate to a parent unit based at another location.

United States Air Force 
Air Combat Command (ACC)

 Twelfth Air Force
 432nd Wing / 432nd Air Expeditionary Wing
 732nd Operations Group
 30th Reconnaissance Squadron (GSU) – RQ-170A Sentinel

See also
 Tonopah Air Force Station (Evaluation of Soviet "Barlock" Radar)

Footnotes

References 
 Gordon, Yefim.  Mikoyan-Gurevich MiG-19, the Soviet Union's first production supersonic fighter. 2003. Midland Publishing, UK.  .
Michell III, Marshall L. Clashes; Air Combat Over North Vietnam 1965–1972.  1997, Naval Institute Press.  .

External links

 F-117A: The Black Jet Website
 Declassified  Presentations of the tactical and technical exploitation of the MiG-17 and MiG-21 at Tonopah:
 Have Doughnut - MiG-21 Tactical Evaluation
 Have Doughnut - Mig-21 Technical Evaluation
 Have Drill - Mig-17 Tactical Evaluation
 Have Drill - Mig-17 Technical Evaluation
 

Installations of the United States Air Force in Nevada
Airports in Nevada
Buildings and structures in Nye County, Nevada
Transportation in Nye County, Nevada
Airports established in 1957
Military installations established in 1957
1957 establishments in Nevada